Andrzej Głąb (born 10 November 1966 in Chełm) is a Polish wrestler who competed in the 1988 Summer Olympics. He won a silver medal at the 1988 Summer Olympics in wrestling in the 48 kg category (light-flyweight).

References

External links
 

1966 births
Living people
Olympic wrestlers of Poland
Wrestlers at the 1988 Summer Olympics
Polish male sport wrestlers
People from Chełm
Olympic medalists in wrestling
Sportspeople from Lublin Voivodeship
Medalists at the 1988 Summer Olympics
Olympic silver medalists for Poland
20th-century Polish people
21st-century Polish people